Lost Lake is located in Minnehaha County, South Dakota, United States.

History
Lost Lake was given its name because the surrounding hills hid the lake so well.  The hills rendered the lake virtually invisible until the shores were reached.

See also
List of South Dakota lakes
List of lakes

References

External links
  

Lakes of South Dakota
Lost Lake